Adenanthera bicolor is a species of plant in the family Fabaceae.
It is found in Malaysia, and Sri Lanka.

References

bicolor
Flora of Sri Lanka
Vulnerable plants
Taxonomy articles created by Polbot